Canadian honorifics are few in number, and many of them are maintained from before Confederation and originate from the British honours system.

Royal and governmental honorifics

Military honorifics
Officers and non-commission members within the Canadian Armed Forces use ranks in accordance with the ranks and insignia of the Royal Canadian Navy, the Canadian Army, or the Royal Canadian Air Force, depending on which element they are a part of. Although all of the rank structures of the separate services were abolished with the unification of all three into one Canadian Forces in 1964, distinctive uniforms, insignia, and rank names have been gradually restored since then. Former members who were honourably released after serving a minimum of 10 years may continue to use the rank title held at the time of release with the word "(Retired)" or abbreviation "(Ret'd)". Similarly, members of the Supplementary Reserve sub-component of the Reserve Force may use their rank in the same manner as former members, unless on duty or engaged in military activities.

Religious honorifics
Religions are free to use their own titles and honorifics, provided they do not contradict those used elsewhere in Canada. This is seen in the use of the style His Excellency by Roman Catholic archbishops and bishops, which is not recognized by Canadian civil authorities.

See also
 List of post-nominal letters in Canada
 Title and style of the Canadian monarch
 List of titles and honours of Queen Elizabeth II
 List of titles and honours of Prince Philip, Duke of Edinburgh
 List of titles and honours of Charles III
 List of titles and honours of Elizabeth Bowes-Lyon
 English honorifics

References

External links
 Government of Canada - Styles of address

Social history of Canada
Honorifics by country